The Gandarbha caste or Gaine are a Dalit community which belongs to the Indo-Aryan ethnic group from the central, hilly region of Nepal. They have also been called a "caste of professional musicians" and "itinerant bards." By tradition they make their living by singing Gandarbha Geet or Gaine Geet, a type of folk song. The Gandarbhas traditionally work as travelling musicians and play traditional folk and historical songs. They improvise songs too, incorporating news into them as a service, in return for which they receive donations of food or other things. They use the Nepali sarangi, a type of violin, as their main musical instrument. The sarangi has been an iconic musical instrument identified with the Gandarbha people. The instrument has replaced another instrument they played, the aarbajo, which was larger and "more cumbersome."

Due to many caste-based discriminations in Nepal, the government of Nepal legally abolished the caste-system and criminalized any caste-based discrimination, including "untouchability" (the ostracism of a specific caste) - in the year 1963 A.D.

Popular Gandarbhas
 Jhalak Man Gandarbha

See also
 Gandharva
Damai

References

External links
News article about Gandarbhas and their future.
Modern Gandarbha plays incorporates public safety message in music on buses.
Ethnic groups in Nepal